Olav Svalastog (27 July 1896 – 16 October 1979) was a Norwegian politician for the Christian Democratic Party.

He was elected to the Norwegian Parliament from Telemark in 1945, but was not re-elected in 1949.

Svalastog was a member of Solum municipal council from 1955 to 1957.

He was born in Nissedal, Svalastog worked as a teacher in Vrådal, Treungen, Tveit, Solum and Fjære.

References

1896 births
1979 deaths
Members of the Storting
Christian Democratic Party (Norway) politicians
Politicians from Telemark
People from Nissedal
Norwegian resistance members
20th-century Norwegian politicians